The Pingat Penghargaan (Tentera) is a decoration awarded to any member of the Singapore Armed Forces who has placed himself above his peers through commendable achievements in military command or staff work, or who has performed service over and above the call of duty. The Pingat Kepujian is the civil equivalent award.

Prior to 1996, the three services issued their own version of the Pingat Penghargaan (Tentera). Whilst retaining the same name, the ribbons and medals differed. The individual service medals where issued in three grades: Gold, Silver and Bronze.

Description
 The ribbon is red with a double white central stripe.

References
MINDEF Singapore Medals factsheet page
World Medals Pingat Penghargaan page

Military awards and decorations of Singapore